Grumpy is a 1930 American pre-Code drama film directed by George Cukor (in his directorial debut) and Cyril Gardner, and released by Paramount Pictures. The screenplay by Doris Anderson is based on a play by Horace Hodges and Thomas Wigney Percyval. A Spanish-language version entitled Cascarrabias, written by Catalan writer Josep Carner Ribalta (1898–1988) and directed by Gardner, was released by Paramount the same year. The film is a remake of a 1923 silent film of the same title.

Plot
The titular character is a temperamental but lovable retired London barrister now living in the country with his granddaughter Virginia. Ernest Heron, Virginia's beau, returns from South Africa with a valuable diamond, and that night he is attacked and the gem is stolen. The only clue to the perpetrator's identity is a camellia Ernest is found clutching in his hand.

Suspicion falls upon Chamberlin Jarvis, an acquaintance of Virginia who was a houseguest at the time, and Grumpy follows him when he returns to the city, where he tries to sell the diamond to Berci. Knowing Jarvis is a suspect, Berci turns him away, and the thief, frightened by a confrontation with Grumpy, eventually returns to the country, returns the jewel, and is arrested.

Cast
Cyril Maude ..... Grumpy Bullivant
Phillips Holmes ..... Ernest Heron
Frances Dade ..... Virginia Bullivant
Paul Lukas ..... Berci
Paul Cavanagh ..... Chamberlin Jarvis

Production
The film marked George Cukor's debut as a film director. Exteriors were filmed in Kernville, California. Interiors were filmed at Paramount's Astoria Studios in Queens, New York.

External links

Cascarrabias at IMDB

1930 films
1930 crime drama films
Films set in London
Remakes of American films
Sound film remakes of silent films
Films directed by George Cukor
Paramount Pictures films
Films directed by Cyril Gardner
American crime drama films
American multilingual films
American black-and-white films
Films shot at Astoria Studios
1930 multilingual films
1930s English-language films
1930s American films